Steve Jackson may refer to:

Steve Jackson (running back) (born 1983), American football running back
Steve Jackson (mathematician), American set theorist at University of North Texas
Steve Jackson (British game designer) (born 1951), co-founder, with Ian Livingstone, of Games Workshop and Fighting Fantasy
Steve Jackson (American game designer) (born 1953), founder of Steve Jackson Games in the early 1980s
Stevie Jackson (born 1969), Scottish musician and member of the band Belle & Sebastian
Steve Jackson (rugby league) (born 1965), Australian rugby league footballer
Steve Jackson (thriller writer) (born 1969), created MI6 spy, Paul Aston
Steve Jackson (linebacker) (born 1942), American football linebacker
Steve Jackson (defensive back) (born 1969), American football defensive back
Steve Jackson (rugby union), New Zealand rugby union player and coach

See also
Steven Jackson (disambiguation) - including Stephen Jackson disambiguations